The Trouble Tree is the debut album by Freedy Johnston, released in 1990 through Bar/None Records.

Production
The album was recorded in Hoboken, New Jersey.

Critical reception
Trouser Press wrote that the album "captures Johnston’s wheedling and whiny voice in extreme close-up, forcing listeners to seek refuge in overextended wordplay and spare guitar-based arrangements." The Spin Alternative Record Guide called it "raw-sounding, infatuated with dangerous sorts, and a bit unformed lyrically."

Track listing

Personnel 
Musicians
Alan Bezozi – drums
David Hamburger – guitar
Freedy Johnston – vocals, guitar
James MacMillan – bass guitar, engineering
Doug Snodgrass – bass guitar
Production and additional personnel
Chris Butler – production, guitar on "Fun Ride" and "After My Shocks"
Andy Burton – keyboards on "Fun Ride"
B. Woody Giessmann – drums on "Little Red Haired Girl"
John Halpern – photography
Jody Harris – guitar on "Fun Ride"

References

External links 
 

1990 debut albums
Bar/None Records albums
Freedy Johnston albums